Marcus Duronius was a tribune of the plebs, most likely in 97 BC. He abrogated a sumptuary law, one of the Leges Liciniae. In retaliation, the Roman censors Lucius Valerius Flaccus and Marcus Antonius expelled him from the Senate. Duronius then brought an accusation of ambitus against Antonius.

References

See also
 Duronia (gens), for other members of the family

1st-century BC Romans
Tribunes of the plebs